Oligodon modestus, commonly known as the spotted-bellied short-headed snake or the Luzon kukri snake, is a species of snake of the family Colubridae.

Geographic range
The snake is found in the Philippines.

References 

modestus
Snakes of Asia
Reptiles of the Philippines
Endemic fauna of the Philippines
Taxa named by Albert Günther
Reptiles described in 1864